Foundation University, also referred to by its acronym FU or simply Foundation, is a private non-sectarian basic and higher education institution in Dumaguete, Philippines. It was founded by Dr. Vicente Guzman Sinco, former president of the University of the Philippines and an alumnus of Silliman University. It offers over 60 specialized higher education areas of study accredited with the PAASCU, CHED, and the Philippine Association of Colleges and Universities Commission on Accreditation.
The university is known as the birthplace of Negros Oriental's Buglasan Festival. The university is also known as an eco-friendly school. In 2015, Foundation University was awarded National Champion by the DENR - Environmental Management Bureau (EMB) for being the Most Sustainable and Eco-Friendly Campus.

History

The university was established as Foundation College on July 4, 1949. It was granted university status by the Department of Education on January 28, 1969. The university offers many undergraduate courses such as in the fields of elementary education, secondary education, nursing, information technology, computer science, agriculture, engineering, law and many others. The university has schools for elementary and high school.

Established on the eve of the country's independence, it was then known as the Foundation College. The college was founded by Dr. Vicente Guzman Sinco, a known educator and legal luminary during his time. Sinco envisioned the college to contribute to the overall national program of development. During the time of the college's founding, Filipinos were still in the process of building the nation.

The college had a three-fold function — instruction, research, and community action. The success of this mission was recognized in 1963, when Foundation College received international recognition and was invited to become a member of the International Association of Universities. The college was the first institution in the Visayas and Mindanao to receive this honor, and the first institution in the world that was not a full university to become a member of this organization.

On January 28, 1969, the Philippine Department of Education granted the college a university charter.

Colleges and schools

Academic units of the university are organized into nine colleges and several other schools and departments.

Media
Since October 2012, the university has its own radio station called Greyhound 101.

Notes and references

Notes

References

External links

Universities and colleges in Negros Oriental
Educational institutions established in 1949
Education in Dumaguete
1949 establishments in the Philippines